Saroja Coelho is a Canadian journalist and radio personality, currently the host of Mornings on CBC Music.

Originally from Toronto, Ontario, Coelho was a foreign correspondent, reporting from Asia and Eastern Europe for CBC, BBC, NPR, Deutsche Welle and National Geographic. In 2012, she became the host of Living Planet on Deutsche Welle, before returning to Canada to host Breakaway, the local afternoon program for CBC Radio One's Quebec Community Network in 2016. She returned to Toronto in 2018, where she was a regular guest host of Here and Now during Gill Deacon's health leave, and became host of Mornings after Raina Douris left the program in 2019.

Coelho studied biology and political science at the University of Toronto, and was a coordinator of Women Active, Vocal, Effective and Strong, a leadership program for young girls, in the early 2000s.

References

CBC Radio hosts
Canadian talk radio hosts
Canadian people of English descent
Canadian people of Indian descent
University of Toronto alumni
People from Toronto
Living people
Year of birth missing (living people)
Canadian women radio hosts